This article shows statistics of individual players for the football club Dinamo Zagreb. It also lists all matches that Dinamo Zagreb played in the 2006–07 season.

Competitions

Overall

Prva HNL

Classification

Results summary

Results by round

Matches

Player seasonal records
Competitive matches only. Updated to games played 26 May 2007.

Goalscorers

Source: Competitive matches

References

External links
 Dinamo Zagreb official website

GNK Dinamo Zagreb seasons
Dinamo Zagreb
Croatian football championship-winning seasons